The 2023 SAFF Championship will be the 14th edition of the SAFF Championship, the biennial international men's football championship of South Asia organised by South Asian Football Federation (SAFF). The event will be held in India from 21 June–3 July.

India are the previous champions of the SAFF Championship. They won the title for the eighth time in 2021, defeating Nepal in the final.

Host selection

Bids
Football Sri Lanka initially expressed their interest to bid for hosting the tournament, at the SAFF Executive Committee meeting on 17 October 2021 in the Maldives. FIFA suspended Sri Lanka on 21 January 2023, which is why they are unable to host or participate.

Later, Anwarul Haq Helal, the general secretary of SAFF unofficially told media that only Nepal had applied for hosting rights till the deadline (i.e. 29 January 2023). However, the host was supposed to be announced only after the SAFF members' meeting during 33rd AFC Congress 2023 in Manama, Bahrain on 1 February 2023.

On 14 February 2023, India were declared as hosts of the 14th edition of the championship. The centralized venue, however, would be declared on 10 March 2023 by the AIFF.

On 19 March 2023, AIFF announced Bengaluru as host city for SAFF Championship 2023.

Participating nations
The Football Sri Lanka was sanctioned by FIFA on 21 January 2023, hence they are ineligible to participate in the competition.

Squads
For the list of squads, see 2023 SAFF Championship squads.

Venue
The Sree Kanteerava Stadium in Bengaluru will host all the matches.

Officials

Group stage
The precise format and schedule of the SAFF Championship are yet to be approved. However, the currently proposed format is the group-knockout format for the tournament, like in the 2018 edition.

Table

Tiebreakers
Teams were ranked according to points (3 points for a win, 1 point for a draw, 0 points for a loss), and if tied on points, the following tie-breaking criteria were applied, in the order given, to determine the rankings.
Points in head-to-head matches among tied teams;
Goal difference in head-to-head matches among tied teams;
Goals scored in head-to-head matches among tied teams;
If more than two teams are tied, and after applying all head-to-head criteria above, a subset of teams are still tied, all head-to-head criteria above are reapplied exclusively to this subset of teams;
Goal difference in all group matches;
Goals scored in all group matches;
Penalty shoot-out if only two teams were tied and they met in the last round of the group;
Disciplinary points (yellow card = 1 point, red card as a result of two yellow cards = 3 points, direct red card = 3 points, yellow card followed by direct red card = 4 points);
Drawing of lots.

Group A

Group B

Knockout Round

Bracket

Semi-Final

Final

See also 
 2022 SAFF Women's Championship
 2022 AFF Championship
 2022 EAFF E-1 Football Championship
 2023 WAFF Championship
 2023 AFC Asian Cup

Reference

SAFF Championship
2023 in Asian football